Akshay Kumar Das (1903 - ?) was a Bengali Dalit politician of Pakistan, who served as a representative of East Pakistan in both the First and Second Constituent Assemblies, and held multiple ministries across the 1950s in governments formed by different political parties.

Das was born at Sullah, Sylhet in 1903. He was a lawyer by training, and practiced at the local court before joining politics. In the 1937 Assam Provincial Assembly Elections, he filed his nomination from Sunamganj, a dual-member constituency, from the Constitutionalist Party. Das won the reserved seat, unopposed. In February 1938, he was appointed as the Minister of Law in the Second Ministry of Muhammed Saadulah, as Muslim League entered into new coalitions to preserve power. Nonetheless, as the government fell in September with Congress poaching off coalition partners, Das switched sides to become the Minister of Excise and Agriculture under the premiership of Gopinath Bordoloi.

In 1939, with Congress governments resigning from across India in protest against United Kingdom's unilateral decision to enroll Indian forces in the World War II, Assam United Party — an amalgamation of Muslim League with all shades of parties opposed to Congress — formed a successful coalition under Saadulah; however, Das was left out from the cabinet. The Government fell again in December 1941 but after about seven months of Governor's Rule, Saadulah managed to regain the numbers; yet again, Das was not inducted. In March 1945, Congress came into an understanding with the League and formed an unprecedented coalition government with virtually no opposition; Das was brought back to the ministry and assigned the portfolios of Industries and Cooperative Development.

In the 1946 elections, he was re-elected unopposed but as a member of the Congress. He was subsequently elected by the Assembly to represent Assam at the Constituent Assembly of India. Das opposed Partition — unlike many of his Dalit compatriots — and lobbied for the inclusion of Sylhet in India but chose to stay in Pakistan after the referendum went against him, becoming a member of the Constituent Assembly of Pakistan. In Pakistan, he became the President of East Bengal Scheduled Caste Federation in the aftermath of Jogendra Nath Mandal's departure to India (1950) and gained significant political mileage.

In the 1954 East Bengal Legislative Assembly election, Das was re-elected from his seat. In September 1955, he was appointed as the Minister of State for Economic Affairs by Prime Minister Chaudhry Muhammad Ali where he continued until the government fell in September 1956. In October 1957, I. I. Chundrigar (from Muslim League) formed government and appointed him as the Minister of State for Caste Affairs but his government fell within 2 months. Feroz Khan Noon (Republican Party) formed the next government in December, 1957 and had Das appointed as the Minister of State for Finance.

Notes

References

Pakistani MNAs 1947–1954
Living people
Date of birth missing (living people)
People from Sunamganj District
Year of birth missing (living people)
Members of the Constituent Assembly of Pakistan